Paragonimus kellicotti, the North American lung fluke, is a species of parasitic trematode in the genus Paragonimus. This species of Paragonimus has an intricate lifecycle, and although its name may suggest that it is only a health concern in North America, it is also prominent in Southeast Asia and China.

Morphology 
Paragonimus kellicotti parasites have dorsoventrally flattened,  brown, oval-shaped bodies. They are soft-bodied parasites with oral and ventral suckers that are relatively similar in size. They use their ventral suckers to attach to a host. Their tegument is covered with spines, which is a characteristic that sets them apart among other Paragonimus species. Lung flukes are hermaphroditic, having both the female and male organs. Thus, they are able to self-fertilize.

Habitat 
Early larval stages are found in snails and later move on to crustaceans, primarily crawfish and crabs. P. kellicotti parasites may live in fresh or salt water. Thus, they may be found within hosts of swamp, coastal, or forest areas.

Development 
Lung fluke eggs are passed through feces or soil. Eggs then hatch into miricidia within three weeks. A miricidium infects the primary host, snails. Within snails, the miricidium develops into a cercaria. The cercariae eventually leave the snail and infect the second intermediate host, crustaceans. The lung fluke encysts within the tissue of crustaceans until the crustacean is consumed by humans or other animals. Once the fluke has been ingested, enzymes within the digestive tract of the consumer break down the parasitic cysts. The immature parasite continues to mature within the lungs of its new host, feeding on its intestine, and lay eggs. Mature lung flukes may breed year-round. P. kellicotti may live up to 20 years within a human host.

Infection 
Infections of P. kellicotti affect 21 million people worldwide. However, humans rarely become infected in North America. The frequent victims of this infection in North America are small animals that feed on crayfish, such as otters, skunks, and mink. Occasionally, dogs and cats become infected, as well. If these animals are left without treatment, they eventually die. P. kellicotti is a food-borne trematode infection. Humans become infected with the parasite by eating raw or undercooked crayfish meat that contains the parasite larvae. These infections are common in sub-Saharan Africa. After the parasite has been ingested, it will travel from the intestines until it reaches the lungs.

Signs of infection 
Several diagnostic signs indicate a lung fluke infection. These include a cough, fever, and weight loss. Pleural effusion, a condition in which a surplus of fluid accumulates around the lungs, is another sign of an infection. P. kellicotti infection may sometimes be misdiagnosed as tuberculosis. However, a lung fluke infection is differentiated from tuberculosis by increased eosinophils in the blood and pleural fluid.

Treatment 
A P. kellicottii treatment in humans consists oral medication of praziquantel over a minimum of three days to achieve a 100% cure rate  when the parasite is located in the lungs.  Other ectopic infections may require surgical removal.  Surgery does not guarantee all larvae will be removed.

References

Plagiorchiida
Animals described in 1908